John Hartnett January (March 6, 1882 – December 1, 1917) was an American amateur soccer player who competed in the 1904 Summer Olympics.

In 1904 he was a member of the Christian Brothers College team, which won the silver medal in the soccer tournament. He played all four matches as a defender. His younger brothers Charles and Thomas were also members of a silver medal winning team.

References

External links
profile

1882 births
1917 deaths
American soccer players
Footballers at the 1904 Summer Olympics
Olympic silver medalists for the United States in soccer
Medalists at the 1904 Summer Olympics
Association football defenders
Christian Brothers Cadets men's soccer players